Clematochaeta is a genus of tephritid  or fruit flies in the family Tephritidae.

Species
Clematochaeta acrophthalma (Bezzi, 1918)
Clematochaeta discipulchra (Bezzi, 1918)
Clematochaeta euopis Munro, 1957
Clematochaeta pacifer Munro, 1968
Clematochaeta perpallida (Bezzi, 1918)

References

Tephritinae
Tephritidae genera
Diptera of Africa